Since the 2007 municipal reform, Venstre had won the mayor position following all three elections in Kolding Municipality. In the 2017 Kolding municipal election, they would win 13 of the 25 seats, which equalled an absolute majority. Jørn Pedersen, who was mayor from 2010 to 2021, would announce his intention not to stand for a fourth term prior to the election. Instead, in October 2020, it would be confirmed that Eva Kjer Hansen would be the mayor candidate, Venstre would put forward for this election.

On the opposite side of the political spectrum, former Minister of Foreign Affairs Villy Søvndal, would be the top candidate for the Green Left. 
.
Villy Søvndal had led the Green Left to their best result in the party's history in 2007. Apart from that, he had led the Green Left to 6 seats in the 2017 Southern Denmark regional council election, an increase of 4 seats compared to their result in 2013.
Therefore, it was speculated that he could challenge Venstre for the mayor position.

Depsite Venstre losing 4 seats, they became the biggest party and a majority between the traditional blue bloc indiciated that Eva Kjer Hansen would become the new mayor. However, in a dramatic turnaround, outsider Knud Erik Langhoff from the Conservatives would end up having a majority supporting him. Untradtionally, three red bloc parties, Social Democrats, Danish Social Liberal Party
and Green Left would support centre-right Conservatives taking the mayor position.

This would mark the first time since the 2007 municipal reform, that a municipality in the South Jutland constituency would have a mayor from the Conservatives. It was one of three municipalities in the constituency where the Conservatives had mayor's elected in the 2021, and it was seen as a big success for the Conservatives, who had have trouble winning mayor positions outside Greater Copenhagen and  North Zealand in recent elections.

Electoral system
For elections to Danish municipalities, a number varying from 9 to 31 are chosen to be elected to the municipal council. The seats are then allocated using the D'Hondt method and a closed list proportional representation.
Kolding Municipality had 25 seats in 2021

Unlike in Danish General Elections, in elections to municipal councils, electoral alliances are allowed.

Electoral alliances  

Electoral Alliance 1

Electoral Alliance 2

Electoral Alliance 3

Electoral Alliance 4

Results

Notes

References 

Kolding